Rodolfo Herrero was a Mexican military officer, noteworthy for his participation in the Mexican Revolution of 1910 to 1920.  He is generally believed to be the officer responsible for the death of President Venustiano Carranza.

Biography
In early 1920, Herrero was a rebel commander subordinate to General Manuel Pelaez.  However, in March 1920, he surrendered to Carranza's forces under the promise of amnesty and he was allowed to keep his rank of General.

In May 1920, Carranza's government collapsed under pressure from forces supporting Álvaro Obregón.  Carranza and his supporters attempted to flee Mexico City to Veracruz.  At the Aljibes rail station, they were informed that the rail line had been severed and that Veracruz had fallen.  So Carranza proposed to travel on foot north to San Luis Potosí.  It was near the rural village of La Union that Carranza's small party was joined by the forces of Rodolfo Herrero.  Herrero offered to guide and escort Carranza's party through the rugged rural area of northern Puebla.  He escorted the party to the small settlement of Tlaxcalantongo.  Herrero then excused himself by saying he had to attend to a wounded brother Hermilo Herrero, but promised to return.

In the early morning of May 21, 1920, Carranza's party was attacked by soldiers believed to be under the command of the Herrero brothers.  When the dawn came, Carranza was discovered dead from several bullet wounds.

Rodolfo Herrero was ordered to Mexico City for questioning.  Obregón denounced him for murder and treason.  In the Capital, Herrero was questioned at length but not held.  Seven months later, he was confined for a week in the military prison of Santiago Tlaltelolco.  He was stripped of his military rank and cashiered out of the army, but otherwise allowed to go free.

Herrero was subsequently reinstated as a general during the presidency of Obregón, only to be dismissed again during the presidency of Lázaro Cárdenas in 1937. His brother Hermilo Herrero joined forces with Francisco "Pancho" Villa. Slowly moving up the ranks and eventually becoming a general for the Villa army. He died of natural causes in 1964. He always denied that Carranza was murdered. He espoused the alternative theory that Carranza after being wounded in the leg had committed suicide as stated by several eyewitnesses including Paulino Fontes, Manuel Aguirre, Pedro gil Farias and Ignacio Suarez. This theory presumes that general Basave y Piña never intended to kill Carranza but to capture him.

Books
Johnson, William Weber, HEROIC MEXICO: The Violent Emergence of a Modern Nation, 1968, pgs 353-355
 Krauze, Enrique, BIOGRAFIA DEL PODER (1910-1940), pgs 260-267

Mexican generals
People of the Mexican Revolution
Assassins of presidents